Jarrett Zigon is a social theorist, philosopher and anthropologist at the University of Virginia, where he is the William & Linda Porterfield Chair in Bioethics and Professor of Anthropology. From 2018 to 2020, he was the founding director of the Center for Data Ethics and Justice at the University of Virginia. Previously, he had been at the University of Amsterdam and the Max Planck Institute for Social Anthropology.

Biography 

Zigon received an M.A. in liberal arts from St. John's College (1998) and a Ph.D. in anthropology from the City University of New York, Graduate Center (2006). He subsequently was a member of the Institute for Advanced Study, Princeton, a visiting scholar at Columbia University, and a research fellow at the Max Planck Institute for Social Anthropology. His research has been funded through a Fulbright-Hays Fellowship, the Netherlands Organization for Scientific Research (NWO), and the European Research Council (ERC), among others.

Research

Zigon is best known for his writing on ethics and political theory – most particularly for his conceptions of moral breakdown, moral assemblages, attunement, dwelling, and relational ethics. These writings have primarily addressed the topics of the war on drugs, social and political change, and artificial intelligence/data science. Zigon's work has had a major influence on the anthropology of ethics, and critical phenomenological and hermeneutic approaches to ethics and politics.

Zigon is committed to an ongoing conversation between anthropology and philosophy. He is particularly recognized for articulating an anthropology strongly influenced by post-Heideggerian continental philosophy and critical theory, the theoretical articulation of which he describes as critical hermeneutics.

He has contributed several articles to openDemocracy on addiction, the war on drugs, and political activism.

Bibliography

Books
A War on People: Drug User Politics and a New Ethics of Community. Oakland: University of California Press. 2019.
Disappointment: Toward a Critical Hermeneutics of Worldbuilding. New York: Fordham University Press. 2018.
HIV is God's Blessing Rehabilitating Morality in Neoliberal Russia. Berkeley: University of California Press. 2011.
Making the New Post-Soviet Person: Moral Experience in Contemporary Moscow. Leiden: Brill. 2010.
Morality: An Anthropological Perspective. Oxford: Berg Publishers. 2008.

Articles
“Can Machines Be Ethical?: On the Necessity of Relational Ethics and Empathic Attunement for Data-Centric Technologies,” in Social Research: An International Quarterly, vol 86, no. 4. 2019.
“What is a situation?: an assemblic ethnography of the drug war,” in Cultural Anthropology, vol. 30, no. 3. 2015.
“An Ethics of Dwelling and a Politics of World-Building: A Critical Response to Ordinary Ethics,” in Journal of the Royal Anthropological Institute, 20, 746–64. 2014.
“Maintaining the ‘Truth:’ performativity, human rights, and the limitations on politics,” in Theory and Event, vol. 17, no. 3. 2014.
“Temporalization and Ethical Action,” in Journal of Religious Ethics, vol. 42, no. 3. 2014.
“Attunement and Fidelity: Two Ontological Conditions for Morally Being-in-the-World,” in Ethos, vol. 42, no.1. 2014.
“Moral breakdown and the ethical demand: A theoretical framework for an anthropology of moralities,” in Anthropological Theory, vol. 7, no. 2. 2007

References

External links
Faculty Page. Department of Anthropology, University of Virginia.
Academia
openDemocracy

Year of birth missing (living people)
Living people
21st-century American philosophers
21st-century anthropologists
Graduate Center, CUNY alumni
University of Virginia faculty